Hugh Porter (1780–1839) was an Ulster Scots dialects poet.  He was known as the Bard of Moneyslane, a village in County Down.

Hugh Porter correct dates are 1780 - 1865 - taken from his headstone as he is buried in Drumgooland Presbyterian church near Moneyslane along with his wife Agness.
Interesting fact - He named one of his sons after his patron ‘Thomas Tighe’.

External links 
article

People from County Down
1780 births
1839 deaths
Irish poets